Arie Vos (born 12 February 1976) is a Dutch former motorcycle racer.

Career statistics

Grand Prix motorcycle racing

Races by year
(key) (Races in bold indicate pole position) (Races in italics indicate fastest lap)

Supersport World Championship

Races by year
(key) (Races in bold indicate pole position) (Races in italics indicate fastest lap)

Superbike World Championship

Races by year
(key) (Races in bold indicate pole position) (Races in italics indicate fastest lap)

References

External links

1976 births
Living people
Dutch motorcycle racers
250cc World Championship riders
Superbike World Championship riders
Supersport World Championship riders
21st-century Dutch people